Michael John Leigh Barlow (18 January 1936 – 20 January 2023) was an English actor who performed many small roles in a variety of films, television programmes, and plays, under the stage name Tim Barlow or Timothy Barlow.

Life and career
Barlow was born 18 January 1936. His father, a solicitor, died when he was five years old. Barlow was raised by his mother. After graduating from school at the age of 18, he entered the British Army, and spent 15 years in the military.

Barlow left the army in 1969 to pursue a career in acting, receiving advice from Trevor Nunn and Sir Laurence Olivier. He wrote and performed a one-man show in which he described how he came to the decision to go into the acting profession. He previously had much success with another one man show entitled "My Army" in which he described his life in the British army in the 1960s. This toured for many years.

One of his most notable roles was playing Mr. Morrow, a blind man allergic to his guide dog in The Tall Guy alongside Jeff Goldblum. He played Tyssan in the Doctor Who serial Destiny of the Daleks. He also appeared on stage with the Royal Shakespeare Company and as the BFG at the Polka Theatre in Wimbledon, and on screen as Mr Treacher in Hot Fuzz. In 2007 he played an Ancient Blind Oracle in the HBO series Rome.

Barlow lost his hearing in the 1950s when testing a high velocity Muzzle Rifle for the British Army, until 2008, when surgery to fit a cochlear implant allowed him to recover some of his hearing. His experience of having the cochlear implant fitted was detailed in an episode of BBC Radio 4 programme It's My Story, called "Earfull - From Silence into Sound".

In 2016 he performed in Him, an autobiographical work about memory, ageing and the art of theatre, created by theatre-maker Sheila Hill, with videographer Hugo Glendinning, and musician Sebastiano Dessanay.

Director Simon McBurney announced Barlow's death on 21 January 2023, at the age of 87. He died on 20 January 2023 peacefully at home surrounded by love, according to his family.

TV and films

References

External links

1936 births
2023 deaths
English male television actors
People from Blackpool
Male actors from Lancashire
English male stage actors
English male film actors
British Army personnel